William Forster, D.D. (died 1635) was an Anglican clergyman who served in the Church of England as the Bishop of Sodor and Man from 1633 to 1635.

He was educated at St Catharine's College, Cambridge, and later becoming a Fellow of the college. He was appointed a canon of Chester in 1618.

He was nominated bishop of Sodor and Man by William Stanley, 6th Earl of Derby on 26 December 1633 and consecrated on 9 March 1634.

He died in office on 23 or 24 February 1635 and was buried at St Bartholomew's Church, Barrow on 26 February 1635, where he had also been rector.

References 

 
 
 
 
 

1635 deaths
17th-century Church of England bishops
Bishops of Sodor and Man
Alumni of St Catharine's College, Cambridge
Fellows of St Catharine's College, Cambridge
Year of birth unknown